Erbessa josia is a moth of the family Notodontidae first described by Cajetan and Rudolf Felder in 1862. It is found in Brazil.

References

Moths described in 1862
Notodontidae of South America